MMOR may refer to:

 Massively multiplayer online racing
 Master of Management in Operations Research
 Mathematical Methods of Operations Research